Oscar Lovell Shafter (October 19, 1812 – January 22, 1873) was an American attorney and Associate Justice of the Supreme Court of California from January 2, 1864, to December 11, 1867.

Biography
Shafter was born in Athens, Vermont to Mary and William R. Shafter. His father was an attorney, judge and member of the Vermont Legislature. His grandfather, James Shafter, fought in the American Revolution, was one of the founders of the town of Athens in Vermont in 1779, and served in the Vermont Legislature for 20 years. Shafter attended Wilbraham Wesleyan Academy in Massachusetts, and in 1834 graduated from Wesleyan University. After graduation, he returned to Vermont and commenced reading law. He entered Harvard Law School and in 1836 graduated with a LL.B. He returned to Wilmington, Vermont, and entered into private practice for the next 18 years. He was elected to the state Legislature, and ran as the Free Soil Party and Liberty Party candidate for the United States House of Representatives, Senate, and Governor of Vermont.

In 1854, at the invitation of a Vermont friend, Trevor Park, Shafter came to California and practiced law in San Francisco with Halleck, Peachy, Billings & Park. His brother, James McMillan Shafter, also attended Wesleyan University, and graduated from Yale Law School. Arriving in San Francisco in 1855, James joined his brother Oscar in forming the firm of Shafter, Shafter, Park and Heydenfeldt with Trevor Park and Solomon Heydenfeldt, who was the first elected Jewish member of the California Supreme Court, serving from 1852 to 1857. Oscar was renowned as a real estate attorney and expert in quieting title.

In 1857, a complex real estate litigation resulted in Shafter winning a victory for his client, Dr. Robert McMillan, of a large tract of land at Point Reyes in Marin County. McMillan sold the 75,000 acre property at a discount to the Shafters, who paid roughly $85,000 for the parcel. In turn, they leased land to dairy farmers who provided milk and butter to an ever-growing San Francisco and prospered. The families of Oscar and James Shafter owned large portions of Point Reyes from 1857 to 1919, when the land was sold in parcels.

In 1863, a constitutional amendment meant all of the seats of the Supreme Court of California were open for election. In October 1863, Oscar Shafter was elected as a justice on the Republican Party ticket, and begin his term in January 1864. The justices drew lots for term length and Shafter was assigned the long, 10-year term as an associate justice. In December 1867, he resigned due to ill health. Governor Henry Huntly Haight appointed Joseph B. Crockett to Shafter's seat.

Seeking to recover his health, Shafter traveled to Europe. He died at Florence, Italy, on January 22, 1873.

Journals of early California
Shafter kept a journal which describes the natural environment, social customs and living conditions of the California pioneers.

Personal life
He married Sarah Riddle in Wilmington, Vermont, in 1840 and the couple had eleven children: ten daughters and one son. Four daughters and the son died at an early age, the son while Shafter had moved to San Francisco in 1854 before his wife and two of their surviving daughters joined him in 1855. His nephew was William Rufus Shafter, who was a general in the American Civil War and recipient of the Medal of Honor.

See also
 List of justices of the Supreme Court of California
 Augustus Rhodes
 Silas Sanderson
 Lorenzo Sawyer
 John Currey

References

External links
Life, Diary and Letters of Oscar Lovell Shafter, Associate Justice Supreme Court of California, January 1, 1864 – December 31, 1868 (1915)
 Oscar L. Shafter In Memoriam. 47 Cal. Rpts. xiii (1873). California Supreme Court Historical Society. Retrieved July 18, 2017.
 Past & Present Justices. California State Courts. Retrieved July 19, 2017.

1812 births
1873 deaths
Justices of the Supreme Court of California
19th-century American judges
19th-century American lawyers
California pioneers
People from Athens, Vermont
Wesleyan University alumni
Harvard Law School alumni
Lawyers from San Francisco
California Republicans
Vermont Free Soilers
Vermont Libertyites